A condiment is a preparation that is added to food, typically after cooking, to impart a specific flavor, to enhance the flavor, or to complement the dish. A table condiment or table sauce is more specifically a condiment that is served separately from the food and is added to taste by the diner.

Condiments are sometimes added prior to serving, for example, in a sandwich made with ketchup, mustard or mayonnaise. Some condiments are used during cooking to add flavor or texture: barbecue sauce, compound butter, teriyaki sauce, soy sauce, Marmite and sour cream are examples.

Many condiments, such as mustard or ketchup, are available in single-serving packets, commonly when supplied with take-out or fast food meals.

Definition

The exact definition of a condiment varies. Some definitions encompass spices and herbs, including salt and pepper, using the term interchangeably with seasoning. Others restrict the definition to include only "prepared food compound[s], containing one or more spices", which are added to food after the cooking process, such as mustard, ketchup or mint sauce.

Etymology
The term condiment comes from the Latin condimentum, meaning "spice, seasoning, sauce" and from the Latin condire, meaning "preserve, pickle, season". The term originally described pickled or preserved foods, but its meaning has changed over time.

History
Condiments were known in Ancient Rome, India, Greece and China. There is a myth that before food preservation techniques were widespread, pungent spices and condiments were used to make the food more palatable, but this claim is not supported by any evidence or historical record. The Romans made the condiments garum and liquamen by crushing the innards of various fish and then fermenting them in salt, resulting in a liquid containing glutamic acid, suitable for enhancing the flavor of food. The popularity of these sauces led to a flourishing condiment industry. Apicius, a cookbook based on fourth and fifth century cuisine, contains a section based solely on condiments.

List of condiments

Market

In the United States, the market for condiments was US$5.6 billion in 2010 and is estimated to grow to US$7 billion by 2015. The condiment market is the second largest in specialty foods behind that of cheese.

Gallery

See also

 Condiments by country (category)

References

Citations

Sources